A marriage proposal is a custom or ritual, common in Western cultures, in which one member of a couple asks the other for their hand in marriage. If accepted, it marks the initiation of engagement, a mutual promise of later marriage. 

Not all engagements begin with a proposal of marriage. Historically, many marriages have been arranged by parents or matchmakers, and these customs are still sometimes practiced in the modern day. Even when the decision to marry is made by the couple, it may not be communicated between them directly; for instance, in the traditional Japanese custom of Omiai, the formal decision to pursue marriage or to turn it down is communicated between the couple's respective matchmakers.

Customs and traditions 

In Western cultures, a proposal is traditionally made by a man to a woman, while genuflecting in front of her. The ritual often involves the formal asking of the question "Will you marry me, ...?" and the presentation of an engagement ring (often in a small velvet box), which he may place on her finger if she accepts.

Before proposing, a man traditionally privately asks permission from the father of the woman he hopes to marry. When practiced in the modern day, this is usually understood as a formality. 

The proposal itself is often supposed to be a surprise, although in practice this is rarely actually the case.  Surveys have found that most proposals are not surprises, and most wedding engagements begin with a conversation in which the parties mutually agree to wed.

Couples in many Christian denominations have the option of receiving the Rite of Betrothal (also known as 'blessing an engaged couple' or 'declaration of intention'), which often includes prayer, Bible readings, blessing of engagement rings, and a blessing of the couple.

Gender roles 

While the common Western convention is for a man to propose to a woman, there are some traditional exceptions. For instance, as a monarch, Queen Victoria had to propose to Prince Albert. Folk traditions in countries including Scotland, Ireland, England, and Finland allow women to propose on leap days, sometimes with the addition that a man rejecting such a proposal was expected to pay a forfeit to his suitor, usually in the form of a gift of clothing.

Proposals by women are increasingly accepted in Western culture, with most Americans approving of the practice, although the vast majority of proposals in the United States are still made by men. In response to the demand created by this cultural shift, jewelry companies have begun to advertise engagement rings for men. Nevertheless, proposals by women may not be taken seriously or treated as "real" proposals.

Gay and lesbian couples, to whom the traditional gendered proposal does not apply, usually keep some elements of the established ritual while altering others. In some cases, there may be multiple proposals, and each partner may propose to the other.

See also
Banns of marriage
White wedding

References

Further reading

Engagement
Proposals